Ricardo Manuel Fonseca Neves (born 7 January 1989 in Tábua, Coimbra District) is a Portuguese professional footballer who plays for Gondomar S.C. as a goalkeeper.

References

External links

1989 births
Living people
People from Tábua
Sportspeople from Coimbra District
Portuguese footballers
Association football goalkeepers
Liga Portugal 2 players
Campeonato de Portugal (league) players
Boavista F.C. players
C.S. Marítimo players
Varzim S.C. players
Associação Naval 1º de Maio players
S.C. Farense players
U.D. Leiria players
C.D. Cinfães players
Gondomar S.C. players
Portugal youth international footballers
Portuguese expatriate footballers
Expatriate footballers in Spain
Portuguese expatriate sportspeople in Spain